Alcanivorax is a genus of alkane-degrading marine bacteria.

Species
Alcanivorax comprises the following species:
 Alcanivorax balearicus Rivas et al. 2007
 Alcanivorax borkumensis Yakimov et al. 1998
 Alcanivorax dieselolei Liu and Shao 2005
 Alcanivorax gelatiniphagus Kwon et al. 2015
 Alcanivorax hongdengensis Wu et al. 2009
 Alcanivorax indicus Song et al. 2018
 Alcanivorax jadensis (Bruns and Berthe-Corti 1999) Fernández-Martínez et al. 2003
 "Alcanivorax limicola"  Zhu et al. 2021
 Alcanivorax marinus Lai et al. 2013
 Alcanivorax mobilis Yang et al. 2018
 Alcanivorax nanhaiticus Lai et al. 2016
 Alcanivorax pacificus Lai et al. 2011
 Alcanivorax profundi Liu et al. 2019
 Alcanivorax profundimaris Dong et al. 2021
 Alcanivorax sediminis Liao et al. 2020
 Alcanivorax venustensis Fernández-Martínez et al. 2003
 Alcanivorax xenomutans Rahul et al. 2014

References 

Oceanospirillales
Biodegradation
Bacteria genera